The escudo was the currency of Portuguese Guinea between 1914 and 1975. It was equal to the Portuguese escudo and replaced the real at a rate of 1000 réis = 1 escudo. The escudo was subdivided into 100 centavos. Portugal issued banknotes (starting in 1914) and coins (starting in 1933) for use in Portuguese Guinea. Following independence, the peso replaced the escudo at par.

Coins
In 1933, coins were introduced in denominations of 5, 10, 20 and 50 centavos and 1 escudo.

Banknotes
In 1914, notes were issued by the Banco Nacional Ultramarino in denominations of 10, 20 and 50 centavos. In 1921, larger denominations, from 1 escudo up to 100 escudos, were introduced. 500 escudos notes were first issued in 1945, with 1000 escudos notes introduced in 1964.

Currencies of Africa
Modern obsolete currencies
1914 establishments in Portuguese Guinea
1975 disestablishments in Guinea-Bissau
Escudo